The World Group II was the second-highest level of Fed Cup competition in 2014. Winners advanced to the World Group Play-offs, and the losing nations advancing to the World Group II Play-offs.

Canada vs. Serbia

Sweden vs. Poland

France vs. Switzerland

Argentina vs. Japan

References 

World Group II